John Howard Coble (March 18, 1931 – November 3, 2015) was an American politician who was the U.S. Representative for , serving from 1985 to 2015. He was a member of the Republican Party. The district includes all or portions of ten counties in the northern-central part of the state, including portions of Greensboro and Durham.

Early life, education, and pre-political career
Coble was born in Greensboro, North Carolina, the son of Johnnie E. (Holt) and Joseph Howard Coble. After high school, he initially attended Appalachian State University, but after a year joined the United States Coast Guard, serving for over 5 years and staying on as a reservist for an additional 18 years. Upon discharging from military service, he attended Guilford College, from which he received a history degree. He was a member of the Epsilon Iota chapter of Pi Kappa Phi fraternity at The University of North Carolina at Greensboro. Coble then moved on to the University of North Carolina at Chapel Hill and earned a degree in law.

After graduating from college, Coble first worked as an insurance agent. He then spent nearly 20 years as a practicing attorney, and he was also Secretary of Revenue under North Carolina Governor James Holshouser. In 1979, Coble was elected to the North Carolina House of Representatives, serving until his election to Congress.

U.S. House of Representatives

Elections

Coble was first elected to Congress in 1984, narrowly defeating Walter Cockerham in the primary 51%–49%. In the general election, he defeated one-term Democratic incumbent Robin Britt 51%–49%. Coble was likely the beneficiary of long coattails from Ronald Reagan, who carried the district by a nearly 2-to-1 margin. In 1986, he defeated Britt in a rematch, which was an even closer 50.03%–49.97% and Coble won by only 79 votes (closest margin of victory that year). He would never face another contest nearly that close, and would be reelected 13 more times with 61% or more of the vote. In July 2008, Coble won the Republican primary unopposed and became North Carolina's longest-serving Republican U.S. congressman, surpassing former U.S. Congressman Jim Broyhill (who was also elected to 12 terms but left the House in July 1986 to fill a vacant U.S. Senate seat). Coble announced in 2013 that he would not run for another term in 2014, and would retire after 30 years in Congress.

Tenure
In the 105th United States Congress Coble moved to suspend the rules and pass the NET Act on November 4, 1997, which removed the requirement of financial gain for criminal prosecution of copyright violation.  The NET Act was passed only after the House suspended the rules.

Coble was a strong supporter of agriculture and had voted in favor of bills to protect agriculture. Coble opposed further regulation of tobacco because he believed it would hurt North Carolina tobacco planters.

Coble took a hard-line position on illegal drugs, and co-sponsored a resolution to oppose the legalization and use of medical marijuana. He also voted for an amendment to authorize drug testing on federal employees. However, he authored a resolution to celebrate the passage of the Twenty-first Amendment, which repealed the Prohibition of alcoholic beverages in the United States. Coble was also a member of the Tea Party Caucus, joining Sue Myrick and Walter B. Jones as the sole members of the North Carolina Congressional delegation to join the group.

Coble pledged not to receive any pension from the United States government.  He told CBS Up to the Minute, "I figured taxpayers pay my salary – not a bad salary, and I figure that's sufficient.  Let me fend for myself after the salary's collected." He also stated to CBS, "I've pledged my assurance I won't take the pension. That's between my constituents and me. As far as convicted felons, I guess that's between their constituents and themselves."  He was one of two Congressmen, with Ron Paul, to have pledged to decline his pension.

However, during the government shutdown in October 2013.  Coble said that although 800,000 federal workers are furloughed and not receiving a paycheck, he will still collect his salary due to a requirement of law.  Coble was one of the 87 Republicans who voted for the bill to end the shutdown on October 16.

In June 2013, Coble announced introduction of new legislation to reform the congressional pension program. Coble refused to participate in the congressional pension program, stating that reforming congressional pensions was long overdue and that the bill would lengthen the time of service required before a member would be eligible for participation in the pension program.

Legislation sponsored
The bill To extend the Undetectable Firearms Act of 1988 for 10 years (H.R. 3626; 113th Congress) was introduced in the House on December 2, 2013 by Coble. The bill would extend the Undetectable Firearms Act of 1988 for an additional 10 years, but would not expand any of its provisions (related to plastic guns). The bill passed the House on December 3, 2013.

Coble also sponsored the Digital Millennium Copyright Act (DMCA), in 1997, a bill fundamental to the foundation of internet law. It would come into effect in the year 2000.

Committee assignments
 Committee on the Judiciary
 Subcommittee on Courts, Commercial and Administrative Law (Chairman)
 Subcommittee on Intellectual Property, Competition, and the Internet
 Committee on Transportation and Infrastructure
 Subcommittee on Aviation
 Subcommittee on Coast Guard and Maritime Transportation
 Subcommittee on Highways and Transit

Caucus memberships
 Congressional Fire Services Caucus
 Congressional Caucus on Turkey and Turkish Americans
 International Conservation Caucus
 Republican Study Committee
 Sportsmen's Caucus
 Tea Party Caucus

Personal life
As a young man, Coble frequently enjoyed eating a breakfast of Rose brand pork brains in milk gravy and eggs. According to a quote from Coble appearing alongside his family recipe for "Breakfast Brains N' Eggs," the breakfast was "fairly regular" and "not at all unusual".

Coble was a member of the Guilford College Board of Visitors and of the U.S. Coast Guard Academy Board of Visitors.

He was a Freemason and member of Guilford Lodge number 656 in Greensboro.

Coble had skin cancer for many years among other ailments. He was admitted to intensive care in September 2015 after complications from skin cancer surgery. He died in hospital on November 3, 2015, in Greensboro, North Carolina at the age of 84 from complications of the surgery.

Electoral history

|+ : Results 1984–2012
! Year
!
! Republican
! Votes
! %
!
! Democratic
! Votes
! %
!
! Third Party
! Party
! Votes
! %
!
! Third Party
! Party
! Votes
! %
!
|-
|1984
||
| |Howard Coble
| |102,925
| |51%
|
| |Robin Britt
| |100,263
| |49%
|
|
|
|
|
|
|
|
|
|
|
|-
|1986
||
| |Howard Coble
| |72,329
| |50%
|
| |Robin Britt
| |72,250
| |50%
|
|
|
|
|
|
|
|
|
|
|
|-
|1988
||
| |Howard Coble
| |116,534
| |62%
|
| |Tom Gilmore
| |70,008
| |38%
|
|
|
|
|
|
|
|
|
|
|
|-
|1990
||
| |Howard Coble
| |125,392
| |67%
|
| |Helen Allegrone
| |62,913
| |33%
|
|
|
|
|
|
|
|
|
|
|
|-
|1992
||
| |Howard Coble
| |162,822
| |71%
|
| |Robin Hood
| |67,200
| |29%
|
|
|
|
|
|
|
|
|
|
|
|-
|1994
||
| |Howard Coble
| |98,355
| |100%
|
| |No candidate
| |
| |
|
|
|
|
|
|
|
|
|
|
|-
|1996
||
| |Howard Coble
| |167,828
| |73%
|
| |Mark Costley
| |58,022
| |25%
|
| |Gary Goodson
| |Libertarian
| |2,693
| |1%
|
|
|
|
|
|
|-
|1998
||
| |Howard Coble
| |112,740
| |89%
|
| |No candidate
| |
| |
|
| |Jeffrey Bentley
| |Libertarian
| |14,454
| |11%
|
|
|
|
|
|
|-
|2000
||
| |Howard Coble
| |195,727
| |91%
|
| |No candidate
| |
| |
|
| |Jeffrey Bentley
| |Libertarian
| |18,726
| |9%
|
|
|
|
|
|
|-
|2002
||
| |Howard Coble
| |151,430
| |90%
|
| |No candidate
| |
| |
|
| |Tara Grubb
| |Libertarian
| |16,067
| |10%
|
|
|
|
|
|
|-
|2004
||
| |Howard Coble
| |207,470
| |73%
|
| |William Jordan
| |76,153
| |27%
|
|
|
|
|
|
|
|
|
|
|
|-
|2006
||
| |Howard Coble
| |108,433
| |71%
|
| |Rory Blake
| |44,661
| |29%
|
|
|
|
|
|
|
|
|
|
|
|-
|2008
||
| |Howard Coble
| |221,008
| |67%
|
| |Teresa Bratton
| |108,873
| |33%
|
|
|
|
|
|
|
|
|
|
|
|-
|2010
||
| |Howard Coble
| |156,252
| |75%
|
| |Sam Turner
| |51,507
| |25%
|
|
|
|
|
|
|
|
|
|
|
|-
|2012
||
| |Howard Coble
| |222,116
| |61%
|
| |Tony Foriest
| |142,467
| |39%
|
| |Hugh Chauvin
| |Libertarian
| |4,847
| |2%
|
| |Brandon Parmer
| |Green
| |2,017
| |1%
|

References

External links

 
 
 
 Profile  at SourceWatch
 

1931 births
2015 deaths
American Presbyterians
Appalachian State University alumni
Deaths from cancer in North Carolina
Deaths from skin cancer
Guilford College alumni
Republican Party members of the North Carolina House of Representatives
North Carolina lawyers
Politicians from Greensboro, North Carolina
Republican Party members of the United States House of Representatives from North Carolina
State cabinet secretaries of North Carolina
Tea Party movement activists
United States Coast Guard captains
University of North Carolina School of Law alumni
20th-century American politicians
Activists from North Carolina
21st-century American politicians
United States Coast Guard personnel of the Korean War
20th-century American lawyers
United States Coast Guard reservists